Tacoma Defiance, formerly Seattle Sounders FC 2, is an American professional soccer team based in Tacoma, Washington, U.S. that competes in the MLS Next Pro, the third tier of the United States soccer league system, as the reserve team of Seattle Sounders FC. The Defiance is operated by The Baseball Club of Tacoma (operator/owner of the Tacoma Rainiers) and managed by Seattle Sounders FC, while 20 percent of the club is fan-owned through the non-profit Sounders Community Trust.

The club was established in 2014 as Seattle Sounders FC 2 (S2) and originally played at Starfire Sports in Tukwila, Washington. The team moved to Tacoma's Cheney Stadium in 2018 and was rebranded as the Defiance the following season. The Defiance plans to move to the new Sounders headquarters and training facility at Longacres in Tukwila in 2024.

History

The club was announced on October 14, 2014 at an event held at the Chihuly Garden and Glass museum and began play in 2015 at the Starfire Sports Complex in Tukwila. Sounders assistant coach Ezra Hendrickson was named the team's coach on November 13, 2014.

Inaugural season

S2 played its inaugural match on March 21, 2015, winning 4–2 over the defending USL champion Sacramento Republic. Andy Craven notched the first goal in team history. Their second game yielded the team's first shutout, a home game against Whitecaps FC 2 that ended 4–0. Darwin Jones scored the team's first hat-trick during the game.

Tacoma relocation

The owners of the Tacoma Rainiers baseball team had expressed interest in hosting a lower-division soccer team at its ballpark, Cheney Stadium, or a separate soccer stadium as early as 2013. Cheney Field hosted an MLS Reserve League match between the Sounders and Orlando City SC reserve teams in May 2013, which brought an attendance of 2,174. The Rainiers partnered with the Tacoma Stars, an indoor soccer team, and discussed a potential move for S2 with the Sounders organization. The Sounders had previously discussed plans to move their lower-league franchise to the Tacoma area in the 2000s in the event of a successful MLS expansion bid.

On May 6, 2017, the Sounders and Rainiers announced that they had agreed to relocate the reserve team to Tacoma upon completion of a new, 5,000-seat soccer-specific stadium by 2020. After the USL announced its intention to refuse waivers for teams with smaller venues that did not meet full Division II requirements, the Sounders announced in November 2017 that S2 would temporarily play at Cheney Stadium in Tacoma beginning in the 2018 season. The team had previously played in front of crowds of less than 1,000 at Starfire Sports, but debuted at Cheney Stadium with a sellout crowd of 6,049 on March 16, 2018. The team failed to qualify for the USL playoffs, but the first season in Tacoma garnered an average attendance of over 3,000.

The club was re-branded as the Tacoma Defiance on January 30, 2019, following a campaign to solicit suggestions from the public for a new name. The Defiance name was the top choice in the poll and references Point Defiance Park and Tacoma's civic pride. MultiCare Health System was named as the team's jersey sponsor and Reign FC of the National Women's Soccer League also announced a move to Cheney Stadium for the 2019 season. Sounders FC Academy Director Chris Little had been named as the team's new head coach a week earlier, replacing John Hutchinson.

MLS Next Pro
The club announced on December 6, 2021, that it was joining the inaugural 21-team MLS Next Pro season starting in 2022.

Team colors and crest

The Tacoma Defiance branding was unveiled on January 30, 2019, replacing the original S2 brand that was inherited from the Sounders. The name references Point Defiance Park, a major park with gardens, a zoo and aquarium complex, and several marinas.

The original team colors for S2 were inherited from the first team, including the Sounders' trademark Rave Green. The crest was a green silhouette of the Sounders crest, itself constructed with symbolism representing the club, fans, and players, with "S2" in the center. The club continues to use the basic silhouette in their secondary mark, with "TAC" in the center to represent Tacoma. A tertiary crest includes the words "Defiantly Tacoma".

Sponsorship

Stadium

The Defiance plays home matches at Cheney Stadium in Tacoma, Washington. The stadium has capacity for 6,500. They played at the Starfire Sports Complex from 2015–2017, and will still train there. The record for largest attendance for an S2 game at Starfire was 2,951, set on March 21, 2015.

After two years in Tukwila, it was announced that the team would move its business operations and home field to Tacoma, Washington. A new 5,000-seat soccer stadium was also announced with an estimated opening date of 2021, located on city-owned land adjacent to Cheney Stadium. The preliminary plan approved by Metro Parks Tacoma is to use part of Heidelberg Davis Park near Foss High School for the stadium and a complex of sportsfields for public use. Following the departure of OL Reign in 2021, the stadium plan was paused and later scrapped in favor of relocating the Defiance to a new Sounders training facility at Longacres in Tukwila. It is scheduled to open in 2024.

Ownership and team management

The ownership of the club is composed of two groups. The majority owner is the Sounders FC organization, with the non-profit Sounders Community Trust owning minority share of 20%. Since 2017, the business operations of the Defiance is under the management of the Tacoma Rainiers, a Triple-A baseball affiliate of the Seattle Mariners, while soccer operations are managed by the Sounders.

Andrew Opatkiewicz was hired as the General Manager in October 2014, having experience with Seattle Wolves FC (now Washington Crossfire). Retired MLS veteran defender and former Assistant Coach and Reserve team coach of Seattle Sounders FC, Ezra Hendrickson, was announced as the head coach of S2 on November 13, 2014.

Opatkiewicz took an indefinite leave of absence from the team in May 2016 and Kurt Schmid, the former Seattle Sounders FC head scout and son of then-coach Sigi Schmid, was named as S2 GM on an interim basis. Prior to the start of the 2017 USL season, Schmid was formally named the S2 GM and John Hutchinson was added as an assistant coach on Hendrickson's staff. Chris Little was named the head coach of S2 shortly before its rebranding as the Defiance in 2019. Little left the organization in February 2021 to become an assistant coach for the Colorado Rapids and was replaced by assistant Wade Webber.

Players

Current roster

Out on loan

Technical staff
.

Head coaches

 Includes Regular season & Playoffs

Statistics

Most points

The following players are the club's top point leaders.
As of October 13, 2018

Bolded players are currently on the Sounders FC 2 roster.
 Two points awarded per goal.

Record
Year by Year

References

External links

Sounders Community Trust website

 
Seattle Sounders FC
MLS Next Pro teams
Former USL Championship teams
Association football clubs established in 2014
2014 establishments in Washington (state)
Reserve soccer teams in the United States
Soccer clubs in Washington (state)
Sports in Tacoma, Washington